Public Eye or The Public Eye may refer to:

 Public Eye (TV series), a British television series that ran from 1965 to 1975
 The Public Eye (TV series), a Canadian television public affairs television series which aired on CBC Television from 1965 to 1969
 The Public Eye (film), a 1992 American neo-noir film written and directed by Howard Franklin
 Follow Me! (film), a 1972 British film released as The Public Eye in the US
 Public Eye (organization), a sustainability-oriented, politically and religiously independent solidarity development based in Switzerland
 Public Eye Awards, an award given to the corporations deemed most harmful to society
 The Public Eye (magazine), an investigative magazine published by Political Research Associates
 Public Eye Network, a progressive investigative group founded in the 1970s in the United States
 The Public Eye (Dollhouse), a 2009 episode of the TV series Dollhouse
The Public Eye (play), a 1962 play by Peter Shaffer